Cristian Exequiel Valenzuela Guzmán (born 28 April 1983) is a visually impaired Paralympian with congenital glaucoma. He competed for Chile at the 2012 Summer Paralympics. He won his country's first Paralympic medal, gold, in the men's 5,000 metres T11 with a time of 15:26.26. His guide was Cristopher Guajardo.

References 

1983 births
Living people
Paralympic athletes of Chile
Athletes (track and field) at the 2012 Summer Paralympics
Medalists at the 2012 Summer Paralympics
Visually impaired category Paralympic competitors
Chilean male middle-distance runners
Chilean male long-distance runners
Paralympic gold medalists for Chile
Paralympic medalists in athletics (track and field)
Medalists at the 2015 Parapan American Games
Athletes (track and field) at the 2020 Summer Paralympics
Chilean blind people